Myrmagua is a genus of spiders in the family Salticidae. It was first described in 2016 by Prószyński. , it contains only one species, Myrmagua guaranitica, found in Argentina.

References

Salticidae
Monotypic Salticidae genera
Spiders of Argentina